

Partywise poll results

Lok Sabha members from Rajasthan
Ganganagar (SC), Nihalchand Meghwal, Bharatiya Janata Party
Bikaner, Dharmendra, Bharatiya Janata Party
Churu, Ram Singh Kaswan, Bharatiya Janata Party
Jhunjhunu, Sis Ram Ola, Indian National Congress
Sikar, Subhash Maharia, Bharatiya Janata Party
Jaipur, Girdhari Lal Bhargava, Bharatiya Janata Party
Dausa, Sachin Pilot, Indian National Congress
Alwar, Dr. Karan Singh Yadav, Indian National Congress
Bharatpur, Vishvendra Singh, Bharatiya Janata Party
Bayana (SC), Ramswaroop Koli, Bharatiya Janata Party
Sawai Madhopur (ST), Namo Narain Meena, Indian National Congress
Ajmer, Rasa Singh Rawat, Bharatiya Janata Party
Tonk (SC), Kailash Meghwal, Bharatiya Janata Party
Kota, Raghuveer Singh Koshal, Bharatiya Janata Party
Jhalawar, Dushyant Singh, Bharatiya Janata Party
Banswara (ST), Dhan Singh Rawat, Bharatiya Janata Party
Salumber (ST), Mahaveer Bhagora, Bharatiya Janata Party
Udaipur, Kiran Maheshwari, Bharatiya Janata Party
Chittorgarh, Shrichand Kriplani, Bharatiya Janata Party
Bhilwara, Vijayendrapal Singh, Bharatiya Janata Party
Pali, Pusp Jain, Bharatiya Janata Party
Jalore (SC), B. Susheela, Bharatiya Janata Party
Barmer, Manvendra Singh, Bharatiya Janata Party
Jodhpur, Jaswant Singh Bishnoi, Bharatiya Janata Party
Nagaur, Bhanwar Singh Dangawas, Bharatiya Janata Party

Results by constituencies

Ganganagar

Bikaner

Churu

Jhunjhunu

Sikar

Jaipur

Dausa

Alwar

Bharatpur

Bayana

Sawai Madhopur

Ajmer

Tonk

Kota

Jhalawar

Banswara

Salumber

Udaipur

Chittorgarh

Bhilwara

Pali

Jalore

Barmer

Jodhpur

Nagaur

References

2004
2004
2004 Indian general election by state or union territory